The Colegio del Uruguay (nowadays the Colegio Superior del Uruguay «Justo José de Urquiza») is an Argentinian educational institution, created by then Governor of Entre Ríos Justo José de Urquiza in the 28th of July of 1849. It was the first in the country to be secular and free. Its first director was Lorenzo Jordana.

It is located in the city of Concepción del Uruguay, in the Uruguay Department of the Province of Entre Ríos. It possesses a historic building dating from 1851. In 1942, it was declared a national historical monument. In 1999, for its 150th anniversary, the building was rebuilt and made into a museum, the College Historical Museum. The college nowadays is set subordinate administratively to the Autonomous University of Entre Ríos.

Alumni 
 Julio Argentino Roca, President of the Nation 1880-1886, 1898-1904;
 Victorino de la Plaza, President of the Nation 1914-1916;
 Arturo Frondizi, President of the Nation 1958-1962;
 Benigno Ferreira, President of Paraguay 1906-1908;
 Valentín Vergara, Governor of Buenos Aires 1926-1930;
 Santiago Baibiene, Governor of Corrientes 1869-1871;
 Felipe A. Texier, Governor of Entre Ríos 1952-1955;
 Miguel M. Nougués, Governor of Tucumán 1880-1882;
 Lucas Córdoba, Governor of Tucumán 1895-1898, 1901-1904;
 Tiburcio Benegas, Governor of Mendoza 1887-1889, 1895;
 José Benjamín de la Vega, Governor of La Rioja 1869-1871;
 Hortensio Quijano, Vice President of the Nation 1946-1952;
 Francisco Beiró, Vice President-elect of the Nation;
 Antonio Sagarna, Minister of the Supreme Court 1928-1947;
 Onésimo Leguizamón, Minister of the Supreme Court 1877-1882;
 Isaac Chavarría, Minister of Interior 1886;
 Wenceslao Pacheco, Minister of Interior 1889, Minister of the Treasury 1885-1890;
 Osvaldo Magnasco, Minister of Justice and Public Instruction 1898-1901;
 José Segundo Decoud, President of the Paraguayan Supreme Court of Justice, 1876-1878;
 Carlos Federico Abente, Paraguayan doctor and poet;
 Olegario Víctor Andrade, journalist, poet and writer;
 Eduardo Wilde, physician, politician and writer;
 Martín Coronado, journalist, poet and playwright;
 Fray Mocho, journalist and writer;
 Lucilo del Castillo, physician;
 Eleodoro Damianovich, physician and army general;
 Juan José Nágera, geologist;
 Arturo Sampay, constitutionalist for the Argentine Constitution of 1949;
 Teresa Ratto, second female doctor in Argentina;
 Domingo Liotta, physician;
 Gustavo Sylvestre, journalist and political analyst.

Deans

References

External Links 
 Detailed and extended information on the institution

National Historic Monuments of Argentina
Buildings and structures in Entre Ríos Province
Museums in Entre Rios Province